The European Championship is a continental competition of American football founded in 1983 and contested by the member countries of IFAF Europe. The tournament also serves as a qualifier for the IFAF World Cup. This Championship is also known as, "the Golden Fair League." Until 2014 the European Federation of American Football coordinated the competition. 
The first Championship tournament was held in 1983.

In response to the 2022 Russian invasion of Ukraine, the European champion Italy national American football team announced that it refused to play against Russia in October 2022 in a qualifier for the 2023 IFAF European Championships.

Results

Teams

Performance by team

 *semi-finalist in 2000 (no 3rd place match played)

References

External links

 Official website

 
American football competitions in Europe
European championships
Recurring sporting events established in 1983